Greene County is a county in Virginia in the eastern United States. As of the 2020 census, the population was 20,552. Its county seat is Stanardsville.

Greene County is part of the Charlottesville, VA Metropolitan Statistical Area.

In recent years, Greene County has grown as a tourism destination for metropolitan areas  to escape to the Shenandoah National Park and Virginia's scenic foothills. www.exploregreene.com

History

Greene County was established in 1838 from Orange County. The county is named for American Revolutionary War hero Nathanael Greene, who was a general in the Continental Army.

A major incident occurred on October 24, 1979, when a natural gas main ruptured, causing an explosion. The resulting fire destroyed the bell tower of the county courthouse and county office building. However, quick action by the firemen on the scene saved the county records which were secured in the vault.

Geography
It is the second-smallest county in Virginia by total area.

Adjacent counties
 Rockingham County, Virginia – west
 Page County, Virginia – northwest
 Madison County, Virginia – northeast
 Orange County, Virginia – southeast
 Albemarle County, Virginia – south

National protected areas
 Shenandoah National Park (part)

Major highways

Demographics

2020 census

Note: the US Census treats Hispanic/Latino as an ethnic category. This table excludes Latinos from the racial categories and assigns them to a separate category. Hispanics/Latinos can be of any race.

2020 Census
As of the census of 2010, there were 18,403 people, 6,780 households, and 5,072 families residing in the county.  The population density was 117.8 people per square mile (38/km2).  There were 7,509 housing units at an average density of 48.1 per square mile (15/km2).  The racial makeup of the county was 87.6% White, 6.3% Black or African American, 0.19% Native American, 0.45% Asian, 0.2% Pacific Islander, 0.64% from other races, and 2.2% from two or more races.  4.2% of the population were Hispanic or Latino of any race.

There were 6,780 households, out of which 32.2% had children under the age of 18 living with them, 59% were married couples living together, 11.1% had a female householder with no husband present, and 25.2% were non-families. 20.1% of all households were made up of individuals, and 6.6% had someone living alone who was 65 years of age or older.  The average household size was 2.69 and the average family size was 3.08. The median age for all individuals in the county was 59.3 years.

The median income for a household in the county was $54,307 and median family income was $60,414. The per capita income for the county was $24,696.  8.4% of the population and 4.9% of families were below the poverty line.  Out of the total population, 8.6% of those under the age of 18 and 11.8% of those 65 and older were living below the poverty line.

Government
Greene is represented by Republican Emmett E. Hanger, Jr. in the Virginia Senate, Republican Robert B. Bell, III in the Virginia House of Delegates and Republican Bob Good in the U.S. House of Representatives.

In May of 2022, County Commissioner of Revenue Larry Vernon Snow resigned and pled guilty to federal charges of witness tampering. He had held the position since 1987, and had been reelected while under indictment. His son, Bryant Austin Snow, also pled guilty to charges of drug distribution.

Board of Supervisors
 At-Large District: Dale Herring (I)
 Midway District: Marie Durrer (I)
 Monroe District: Steve Bowman (R)
 Ruckersville District: Davis Lamb (I)
 Stanardsville District: Bill Martin (I)

Constitutional officers
 Clerk of the Circuit Court: Susan E. Duckworth
 Commissioner of Revenue: Kim Tate (interim) (I)
 Commonwealth's Attorney: Edwin Consolvo (I)
 Sheriff: Steven S. Smith (I)
 Treasurer: Stephanie Allen Deal (I)

Law enforcement

The Greene County Sheriff's Office (GCSO) is the primary law enforcement agency in Greene County, Virginia.

After a 1994 study rated Greene County the second most dangerous county in Virginia for traffic, the Sheriff's office cracked down on speeding. In 1997, the office wrote 15 times more tickets than in 1992.

In November 2016, a few days before election day, the Sheriff's department held a public seminar at Piedmont Virginia Community College on Islam and jihadism. Counter-protestors described the content as islamophobic, and the group that spoke at the seminar was later added to the Southern Poverty Law Center's list of hate groups.

Presidential election results

Public services 
Jefferson-Madison Regional Library is the regional library system that provides services to the citizens of Greene.

Communities

(Population according to the 2020 United States Census)

See also
 Greene County Sheriff's Office
 National Register of Historic Places listings in Greene County, Virginia

References

External links

 Greene County Tourism
 Greene County Economic Development, Virginia
 Welcome to the County of Greene, Virginia
  Greene County Record Newspaper
 Local Weather
 Greene County Historical Society
 Greene County Chamber of Commerce

 
Virginia counties
1838 establishments in Virginia
Populated places established in 1838